Abdullah of Jordan may refer to:

Abdullah I of Jordan (1882–1951)
Abdullah II of Jordan (born 1962), the current king of Jordan